A beer engine is a device for pumping beer from a cask, usually located in a pub's cellar.

The beer engine was invented by John Lofting, a Dutch inventor, merchant and manufacturer who moved from Amsterdam to London in about 1688 and patented a number of inventions including a fire hose and engine for extinguishing fires and a thimble knurling machine. The London Gazette of 17 March 1691 stated "the patentee hath also projected a very useful engine for starting of beers and other liquors which will deliver from 20 to 30 barrels an hour which are completely fixed with brass joints and screws at reasonable rates."

The locksmith and hydraulic engineer Joseph Bramah developed beer pumping further in 1797.

The beer engine is normally manually operated, although electrically powered and gas powered pumps are occasionally used; when manually powered, the term handpump is often used to refer to both the pump and the associated handle.

The beer engine is normally located below the bar with the visible handle being used to draw the beer through a flexible tube to the spout, below which the glass is placed. Modern hand pumps may clamp onto the edge of the bar or be mounted on the top of the bar.

A pump clip is usually attached to the handle giving the name and sometimes the brewery, beer type and alcoholic strength of the beer being served through that handpump.

The handle of a handpump is often used as a symbol of cask ale.  This style of beer has continued fermentation and uses porous and non-porous pegs, called spiles, to respectively release and retain the gases generated by fermentation and thus achieve the optimum level of carbonation in the beer.

In the 1970s many breweries were keen to replace cask conditioned ale with keg versions for financial benefit, and started to disguise keg taps by adorning them with cosmetic hand pump handles. This practice was opposed as fraudulent by the Campaign for Real Ale and was discontinued.

Swan neck 
A swan neck is a curved spout.  This is often used in conjunction with a sparkler - a nozzle containing small holes - fitted to the spout to aerate the beer as it enters the glass, giving a frothier head; this presentation style is more popular in the north of England than in the south.

Sparkler
A sparkler is a device that can be attached to the nozzle of a beer engine. Designed rather like a shower-head, beer dispensed through a sparkler becomes aerated and frothy which results in a noticeable head. More CO2 is carried into the head, resulting in a softer, sweeter flavour to the body due to the loss of normal CO2 acidity.

There is some dispute about the benefits of a sparkler. There is an argument that the sparkler can reduce the flavour and aroma, especially of the hops, in some beers. The counter argument is that the sparkler takes away harshness. 

Breweries may state whether or not a sparkler is preferred when serving their beers. Generally, breweries in northern England serve their beers with a sparkler attached and breweries in the south without, but this is by no means definitive.

Pump clips

Pump clips are badges that are attached to handpumps in pubs to show which cask ales are available.
In addition to the name of the beer served through the pump, they may give other details such as the brewer's name and alcoholic strength of the beer and serve as advertising.

Pump clips can be made of various materials. For beers that are brewed regularly by the big breweries, high quality plastic, metal or ceramic pump clips are used. Smaller breweries would use a printed plastic pump clip and for one-off beers laminated paper is used. There are variations on the material used, and the gaudiness or tastefulness of the decoration depending on how much the brewery wants to market their beers at the point of sale. Novelty pump clips have also been made of wood, slate and compact discs. Some even incorporate electronic flashing lights. Older pump clips were made of enamel.

The term pump clip originates from the clip that attaches it to the pump handle. These consist of a two-piece plastic ring which clamps to the handle with two screws. Plastic and laminated paper pump clips usually have a white plastic clip fixed with a sticky double-sided pad that pushes onto the handle.

See also

 Beer tap

References

External links

 DeeCee's Beer Pump Clips
  National pump clip museum in Nottingham

Beer vessels and serving
Pumps
Bartending equipment